Dangerous Ground is a 1934 British mystery film directed by Norman Walker and starring Malcolm Keen, Jack Raine and Joyce Kennedy. The film was a quota quickie, produced by Paramount's British subsidiary at British and Dominions Elstree Studios in Hertfordshire. The film's editor was David Lean who was working in low-budget films during this stage of his career.

Synopsis
Two insurance detectives work with the police to identify and bring down a crime kingpin. After one is murdered, his partner and his daughter decide to solve the case themselves.

Cast
 Malcolm Keen as Mark Lyndon
 Jack Raine as Philip Tarry
 Joyce Kennedy as Claire Breedon
 Martin Lewis as John Breedon
 Kathleen Kelly as Joan Breedon
 Gordon Begg as Holford
 Henry B. Longhurst as Inspector Hurley

Bibliography
 Chibnall, Steve. Quota Quickies: The Birth of the British 'B' film. British Film Institute, 2007.

External links

1934 films
1934 crime films
1934 mystery films
British mystery films
British crime films
1930s English-language films
Films directed by Norman Walker
Films set in London
Quota quickies
British black-and-white films
British and Dominions Studios films
Films shot at Imperial Studios, Elstree
1930s British films